The 1985–86 Soviet Cup was an association football cup competition of the Soviet Union. The winner of the competition, Torpedo Moscow qualified for the continental tournament.

Competition schedule

First preliminary round
All games took place on June 24, 1985.

Second preliminary round
All games took place on June 30, 1985.

Round of 32
The base game day was August 14, 1985

Round of 16
The base game day was September 13, 1985

Quarter-finals
The base game day was April 2, 1986

Semi-finals
The base game day was April 6, 1986

Final

External links
 Complete calendar. helmsoccer.narod.ru
 1985–86 Soviet Cup. Footballfacts.ru
 1985–86 Soviet football season. RSSSF

Soviet Cup seasons
Cup
Cup
Soviet Cup